Mount Thayer is a mountain in the Santa Cruz mountain range located in Santa Clara County, California. The summit is in a section of the abandoned Almaden Air Force Station, about 1 mile west of Mount Umunhum. The elevation of the summit is at  feet. An old derelict building, surrounded by telephone poles, is located on the summit. Mount Thayer, along with the surrounding property, is off limits to the public.

See also 
 List of summits of the San Francisco Bay Area

References

External links 
 

Mountains of Santa Clara County, California
Mountains of the San Francisco Bay Area
Santa Cruz Mountains
Mountains of Northern California